Matthias Bachinger and Simon Stadler were the defending champions but Bachinger decided not to participate.
Stadler plays alongside Travis Rettenmaier, losing in the first round.
Laurynas Grigelis and Uladzimir Ignatik won the title 7–5, 4–6, [10–5] in the final against Tomasz Bednarek and Olivier Charroin.

Seeds

Draw

Draw

References
 Main Draw

Volkswagen Challenger - Doubles
2012 Doubles